The 2011 Valparaiso Crusaders football team represented Valparaiso University in the 2011 NCAA Division I FCS football season. The Crusaders were by second-year head coach Dale Carlson and played their home games at Brown Field. They are a member of the Pioneer Football League. They finished the season 1–10, 1–7 in PFL play to finish in last place

Schedule

Awards
 #15 Laurence Treadaway S RSSR: Team's Most Valuable Player, All PFL Honorable Mention (Coaches)
 #44 Gabe Ali-El RB FR: Team's Offensive Player of the Year
 #88 Greg Wood P JR: Team's Special Teams Player of the Year, All PFL 2nd Team (Coaches)
 #84 Tanner Kuramata WR FR: Team's Offensive Rookie of the Year
 #48 Ryan Mundy LB FR: Team's Defensive Rookie of the Year
 #61 Nate Koeneman OL FR: Offensive Scout Player of the Year
 #59 J.T. Rotroff LB FR: Defensive Scout Player of the Year
 #77 Nate Blair OL SR: Richard P. Koenig Award, All PFL Honorable Mention (Coaches), All PFL Academic Team,
ADA Academic All Star Team
 #42 Grant Bushong DL SR: Joe Sever Trophy
 #89 Sean McCarty WR RSSR: All PFL Honorable Mention (Coaches)
 #35 Cody Gokan LB RSJR: All PFL Honorable Mention (Coaches)
 #43 Pat Derbak LB SO: All PFL Honorable Mention (Coaches)
 #97 Nikko Carson DL SR: All PFL Honorable Mention (Coaches)

References

Valparaiso
Valparaiso Beacons football seasons
Valparaiso Crusaders football